Kijimuta (written: 雉子牟田) is a Japanese surname. Notable people with the surname include:

, Japanese tennis player
, Japanese tennis player

Japanese-language surnames